The vice-president of Seychelles is the second highest political office in the Seychelles. The position was created in 1996.

Vice-Presidents of Seychelles (1996–present)

Notes

Timeline

See also
Seychelles
Politics of Seychelles
List of colonial governors of Seychelles
List of presidents of Seychelles
Prime Minister of Seychelles
Lists of office-holders

References

External links
World Statesmen – Seychelles

Seychelles

Vice presidents
1996 establishments in Seychelles